This is a timeline documenting the events of heavy metal in the year 2007.

Newly formed bands
 Acid Witch
 Affiance
 Animals as Leaders
 The Atlas Moth
 Attack Attack!
 Barren Earth
 Benevolent
Black Anvil
Burn Halo
Cavalera Conspiracy
Chelsea Grin
Coldrain
The Contortionist
Cormorant
Fallujah 
Fleshgod Apocalypse
Haken
Hooded Menace
Iwrestledabearonce 
Krallice
Kvelertak
KYPCK
Monuments
The Night Flight Orchestra
Northern Kings
Oranssi Pazuzu
Panopticon 
Santa Cruz
Savage Messiah
 Skin
Striker
Unleash the Archers
Versailles
White Wizzard
 Xerath

Reformed bands 
 Artillery
 Carcass
 Crashdïet
 Emperor (for a few shows)
 Extreme
 Rage Against the Machine
 Spinal Tap
 X Japan
 Sacred Reich

Disbandments

 Arcturus
 A Perfect Murder
 The Devin Townsend Band
 I Killed the Prom Queen
 Reverend Bizarre
 Strapping Young Lad
 Send More Paramedics
 Mendeed
 Pungent Stench
 With Passion
 Quiet Riot (reformed in 2010)
 Nodes of Ranvier

Events 
 Wayne Knupp, original vocalist for Devourment died on September 15.
 Pat Mason of Arsonists Get All The Girls passes away on the morning of November 30, his 21st birthday.
 Extreme reunite for the third time, announcing plans for a world tour next year, as well as a new studio album, which will be their first since 1995's Waiting for the Punchline.
 Led Zeppelin get back together one more time for one concert in London.
 In Sorte Diaboli (Dimmu Borgir) becomes the first extreme metal album ever to hit the No. 1 in a Record chart, achieving that position in Norway.
 Andreas Sydow leaves Darkane, being replaced by Jens Broman.
 Witold Kiełtyka, drummer for Decapitated, is killed in a car crash in October.
 Vocalist, Damo and manager, Andy of The Red Shore, died in December.
 Anette Olzon joins Nightwish as their new lead vocalist.
 Peter Lindgren leaves Opeth.
 Jani Liimatainen is fired from Sonata Arctica.
 Jacob Bredahl leaves Hatesphere.
 Mark St. John, guitarist of KISS in 1984, dies in April.
 The song Final Six from Slayer won in the Best Metal Performance category at the 50th Grammy Awards.
 Meiju Enho leaves Ensiferum.
 Paul Raven, bassist for Ministry and former Killing Joke bassist, dies in October.
 Kevin DuBrow, lead singer for Quiet Riot, dies in November.
 Matt Barlow returns as lead singer of Iced Earth.
 Ramallah disbands.
 Matte Modin is fired from Dark Funeral, for disrupting their live performance schedule through deceit, according to the band. He is replaced by Nils Fjällström of Aeon, who is given the stage name "Dominator".
 Gaahl and King ov Hell part ways from Gorgoroth founding member Infernus with the intention of using the band's name and assets themselves, igniting the Gorgoroth name dispute.
 Soichiro Umemura, vocalist of Tokyo Yankees, died on December 11.

Albums released

January

February

March

April

May

June

July

August

September

October

November

December

References

2000s in heavy metal music
Metal